Jérôme Roussillon (born 6 January 1993) is a French footballer who plays as a left-back for Bundesliga club Union Berlin. He is a France youth international, having represented his nation at under-18 and under-20 levels.

Career

Montpellier HSC
Roussillon made his professional debut with Montpellier on 2 May 2012 in a league match against Ajaccio appearing as a substitute.

VfL Wolfsburg
On 6 August 2018, Roussillon joined VfL Wolfsburg on a four-year-deal.

Union Berlin
In January 2023, Roussillon joined Union Berlin.

Career statistics

Club

Notes

References

External links
 
 
 
 
 

Living people
1993 births
Association football fullbacks
French footballers
French people of Guadeloupean descent
People from Sarcelles
INF Clairefontaine players
FC Sochaux-Montbéliard players
Montpellier HSC players
VfL Wolfsburg players
1. FC Union Berlin players
Ligue 1 players
France youth international footballers
French expatriate footballers
Expatriate footballers in Germany
Bundesliga players
Footballers from Val-d'Oise